On 13 June 2004, regional elections were held in Belgium, to choose representatives in the regional councils of the Flemish Parliament, the Walloon Parliament, the Brussels Parliament and the German-speaking Community of Belgium. The elections were held on the same day as the European elections.

Flemish Parliament 

In the Flemish Parliament election, the liberal-socialist government was put to the test. The far right Vlaams Blok became the second largest party in Flanders just after the alliance of conservatives Christian Democratic and Flemish-New Flemish Alliance (CD&V - N-VA). The green party Groen! managed to be elected and keeps half of their seats in the parliament. In contrast with the previous election, the People's Union (VU-ID) has split and the new parties, N-VA and Spirit, allied with CD&V and Different Socialist Party (SP.A) respectively.

Because of the cordon sanitaire of all the other parties against Vlaams Blok, a coalition of at least three parties needed to be formed in order to have a majority in the Flemish Parliament. Groen! confirmed that it did not want to take part in the new coalition, so the only coalition left was a conservative-socialist-liberal tripartite.

In the aftermath of the elections, Yves Leterme (CD&V) was selected to form a Flemish regional government.

Details

Walloon Regional Parliament 

In the aftermath of the elections, Elio Di Rupo (PS) was selected to form a Walloon regional government.

Brussels Regional Parliament 

In the aftermath of the elections, Charles Picqué (PS) was selected to form a Brussels regional government.

Parliament of the German-speaking Community

External links
 Pooling results on the Official Federal web site

2004 elections in Belgium
2004
June 2004 events in Europe